Mark Bernard Word (born November 23, 1975) is a former professional American football player who played defensive end in the National Football League for three seasons for the Kansas City Chiefs and the Cleveland Browns.

Professional career

1999
Word was signed by the Kansas City Chiefs as an undrafted free agent on April 27, 1999.

2000: Word was signed by the Hamilton Tiger-Cats of the CFL. He played 9 games and recorded 15 tackles and 3 sacks. He played one game in 2001 after returning from the NFL.

2001
The St. Louis Rams signed Word on February 2, 2001 and allocated him to NFL Europe on April 17. As a member of the Rhein Fire he recorded nine total tackles, five sacks, three forced fumbles and two passes defensed. He was waived by St. Louis on July 5.

Word was signed by the Cleveland Browns on July 20. He suffered a shoulder injury during training camp and was forced to spend the rest of the season on the injured reserve list. 

In 2002, Word led the Browns with 8.0 sacks. The Browns finished 9-7 and made the playoff as a wildcard team that year.

2005: Word finished out his football career playing for the Montreal Alouettes of the CFL. He played seven regular season games and recorded 11 tackles and  2 sacks.

References

External links
Just Sports Stats

1975 births
Living people
Miami Southridge Senior High School alumni
Players of American football from Miami
American football defensive ends
Canadian football defensive linemen
American players of Canadian football
Butler Grizzlies football players
Hinds Eagles football players
Jacksonville State Gamecocks football players
Kansas City Chiefs players
Rhein Fire players
Cleveland Browns players
Hamilton Tiger-Cats players
Montreal Alouettes players
Tampa Bay Storm players
Cleveland Gladiators players
Players of Canadian football from Miami